Urbia Meléndez (born July 30, 1972) is a Cuban taekwondo practitioner and Olympic medalist. She received a silver medal in flyweight at the 2000 Summer Olympics in Sydney.

References

External links

 

1972 births
Living people
Cuban female taekwondo practitioners
Taekwondo practitioners at the 2000 Summer Olympics
Olympic taekwondo practitioners of Cuba
Olympic silver medalists for Cuba
Olympic medalists in taekwondo
Medalists at the 2000 Summer Olympics
21st-century Cuban women